ANBC may refer to:
 CNBC Asia, formerly ANBC, a television channel
 Arab Nations Basketball Championship